The Consolidated Appropriations Act, 2021 is a $2.3trillion spending bill that combines $900 billion in stimulus relief for the COVID-19 pandemic in the United States with a $1.4trillion omnibus spending bill for the 2021 federal fiscal year (combining 12 separate annual appropriations bills) and prevents a government shutdown. The bill is one of the largest spending measures ever enacted, surpassing the $2.2trillion CARES Act, enacted in March 2020. The legislation is the first bill to address the pandemic since April 2020. According to the Senate Historical Office, at 5,593 pages, the legislation is the longest bill ever passed by Congress.

The bill was passed by both houses of Congress on December 21, 2020, with large bipartisan majorities in support. The bill was the product of weeks of intense negotiations and compromise between Democrats and Republicans during the lame-duck session. After initially criticizing the bill, President Donald Trump signed it into law on December 27.

Legislative history

Background 
Following the approval of some $2.5trillion in stimulus in March and April, Senate Majority Leader Mitch McConnell cautioned against any further spending. From then until mid-October, Republicans and Democrats proposed a series of prospective bills, with support mostly along party lines, and each side voicing criticism of the other party's inclusion of special interests. In September, a non-pandemic-related spending bill was passed to avoid a government shutdown, allowing Congress to focus on a separate relief bill. On November 4, McConnell spoke in favor of passing stimulus during the lame-duck session in November and December. Two days later, Larry Kudlow, the director of President Donald Trump's National Economic Council, indicated that, like McConnell, the Trump administration was interested in a targeted package smaller than $2–3trillion.

Negotiations
On December 1, McConnell implied that some form of relief would come in the spending bill for the fiscal year of 2021. The next day, House Speaker Nancy Pelosi and Senate Minority Leader Chuck Schumer endorsed a $908billion bipartisan plan. A number of Republican senators subsequently endorsed it, with Lindsey Graham (R-SC) saying he had discussed it "extensively" with Trump.

On December 8, Mnuchin presented a $916billion counter-proposal, which Pelosi and Schumer called "unacceptable" because it reduced funding for unemployment insurance from $180billion to $40billion, in exchange for a one-time $600 direct payment for adults and children.

On December 11, a one-week stopgap spending bill was signed into law to allow more time to negotiate stimulus.

The next week, two controversial measures from both parties were moved into a separate $160billion bill called the Bipartisan State and Local Support and Small Business Protection Act of 2020. This bill included the Democrat's request for more state and local government aid, and the Republican's request for a strong COVID lawsuit liability shield for businesses.

Senator Josh Hawley  and Senator Bernie Sanders  planned to bring to vote on December 18 a proposal for direct payments of the same amount provided by the CARES Act ($1,200 per adult making less than $75,000 annually and $500 per child), but this was blocked by Senator Ron Johnson .

On December 18, a 48-hour stopgap bill was passed to keep the government funded through the weekend, with a one-day stopgap bill passed to prolong voting until that Monday, December 21.

At the request of Senator Pat Toomey (R-PA), the bill was modified to require congressional approval of future emergency lending through the Fed, and to rescind about $429billion in unused CARES Act funding.

In order to pass the bill more quickly, Congress used H.R. 133, previously the United States-Mexico Economic Partnership Act, as a legislative vehicle, amending the bill to contain its current text.

Challenges 
During the last few days, logistical challenges arose as the bill, which consisted of some 5,500 pages of text, proved difficult to physically assemble due to printer malfunctions and a corrupted computer file. The file, representing the education portion of the bill, posed a problem in that all portions had to be combined into one overall file. Senator John Thune (R-SD) remarked, "Unfortunately, it's a bad time to have a computer glitch." The delays meant that the two votes in Congress were delayed late into the evening of December 21.

Several members of both parties voiced unhappiness with such a large bill being presented to them with little time to understand what was inside it. Representative Alexandria Ocasio-Cortez  wrote, "It's not good enough to hear about what's in the bill. Members of Congress need to see & read the bills we are expected to vote on," and compared the process to "hostage-taking", while Representative Michael Burgess  said, "This is a tough way to legislate, to save everything til the very end and then pass a very large bill." Senator Ted Cruz  tweeted that the whole process was "ABSURD".

Congress passes the bill 
On the evening of December 21 the votes were held, with large, bipartisan majorities supporting them. The bill was split into two parts in the House, with one portion passing 327–85 and another portion 359–53. The first vote, which included funding for federal agencies, was opposed by 41 Democrats and 43 Republicans. The stimulus portion was in the latter vote, and was supported by Democrats by a 230–2 margin and Republicans by a 128–50 margin (two independents made up the rest). Following that, there was a single vote in the Senate, which passed 92–6.

Also on the night of December 21, Trump signed a weeklong stopgap bill through December 28, avoiding a shutdown while the 5,593-page legislation was being processed. It was the biggest bill ever passed by Congress in terms of length of text. On December 24, Congress began the official process of sending the bill to Trump.

Presidential dispute and signing 

Trump was largely absent from the final series of negotiations on the pandemic relief and omnibus legislation, as he had been focusing almost exclusively on promoting his false claims that the 2020 presidential election had been stolen from him. Trump's Treasury Secretary Steven Mnuchin and other Trump administration officials were involved in the negotiations at each stage and expressed support for the final deal.

In a video released on the evening of December 22, a day after the bill's passage, Trump indicated his dissatisfaction with the bill, calling it a "disgrace" and criticizing it for including what he called "wasteful and unnecessary" spending (Trump complained about the inclusion of funds for foreign aid, the Smithsonian Institution, and the Kennedy Center) and not enough pandemic relief, calling the $600 individual payments "ridiculously low". Trump's last-minute statement shocked Congress and surprised administration officials, including Mnuchin, who was heavily involved in the negotiations. In the video, Trump complained about various spending line items in the bill for not being related to COVID-19, but these expenditures were part of the regular annual (fiscal year 2021) appropriations, not the COVID-19 stimulus portion of the bill. Moreover, the budget items that Trump complained about were part of Trump's own budget proposal for the year, and were similar to budget provisions in previous budgets signed by Trump.

Senate Majority Leader Mitch McConnell said that, if Trump vetoed the bill, the Senate was prepared to convene on December 29 for an override vote.

On the night of December 22, Trump asked Congress to send him a version of the bill with $2,000 rather than $600 individual payments. House Speaker Pelosi and House Majority Leader Steny Hoyer signaled Democratic support of this change, while Senate Minority Leader Schumer encouraged Trump to sign the current bill, stating that "we're glad to pass more aid" at a later date. If no agreement can be reached, the government may shut down, and according to Trump, "the next administration will have to deliver a COVID relief package and maybe that administration will be me". It was speculated that Trump might use a pocket veto.

The president left for his Mar-a-Lago estate on December 23, leaving his intentions unclear. On December 24, House Democrats tried to pass, by unanimous consent, legislation to increase the size of the stimulus checks to $2,000, but House Republicans blocked the proposed increase. Many figures in both parties urged Trump to sign the bill, and planned fallback strategies to keep the government open in case he did not.

Two kinds of pandemic relief payments, Pandemic Unemployment Assistance and Pandemic Emergency Unemployment Compensation, expired on the morning of December 27. On the evening of December 27, after coming under heavy pressure from Democrats and Republicans, Trump signed the bill into law without his demands being met. Upon signing the bill, Trump released a statement containing various false statements and grievances. Trump indicated that he would create "a redlined version" of the bill accompanied by a "formal rescission request to Congress insisting that those funds be removed from the bill." Congress is not expected to act on this request. Trump's delay of nearly a week in signing the bill held up $900billion in emergency relief funds, and because he did not sign the bill a day earlier, millions of Americans enrolled in unemployment programs are unlikely to receive a payment for the final week of 2020.

CASH Act 

On December 28, the House passed the Caring for Americans with Supplemental Help Act (CASH Act), a standalone bill to increase direct payments to $2,000 for those who make under $75,000 annually. It would phase out for those who make up to $115,000. Projected to cost $464billion, the House passed the bill by just over the two-thirds majority vote necessary, under a suspension of the rules.

On December 29, Senate Minority Leader Chuck Schumer moved to pass the bill by unanimous consent, but was blocked by Senate Majority Leader Mitch McConnell. Later that day, McConnell introduced legislation combining increased payments with two other Trump demands: a repeal of Section 230 of the Communications Decency Act (which the president had wanted to include in the National Defense Authorization Act for Fiscal Year 2021), and the establishment of a voter fraud study commission. McConnell later claimed that Trump had requested these items to be tied to the stimulus checks, but there is no record of this. Senator Chris Murphy  has cautioned against sinking the $2,000 stimulus checks with "poison pills". On December 31, Schumer again tried to pass the bill by unanimous consent, which was again blocked by McConnell. Schumer suggested voting on the president's other two requests separately.

On December 30, McConnell criticized the CASH Act for failing to adequately phase out higher-income earners. Bernie Sanders (with Josh Hawley's backing) tried to force a roll-call vote on the law by filibustering a vote to override Trump's veto of the 2021 defense bill. On January 1, 2021, Schumer again called for a vote on $2,000 stimulus checks but was blocked by a Republican senator—ending prospects for the act to be approved by the 116th Congress. On January 6, after democrats won control of the senate by winning two senate seats in Georgia the night before, Schumer said the $2,000 payments were a top priority for him in the 117th Congress. President-elect Joe Biden also supported increasing the payments to $2,000.

Provisions

Coronavirus relief 
The Coronavirus Response and Relief Supplemental Appropriations Act, 2021 (CRRSAA) is Division M of the legislation, and Division N contains additional coronavirus provisions. It is a follow-on to such actions as the CARES Act and Paycheck Protection Program passed in March 2020, and comes after eight months of mostly little progress in negotiations between the different parties and houses of Congress. Many of the negotiations made little progress due to strongly held policy differences being contested. The incumbent president, having lost his bid for re-election, generally played little role in the later stages of the discussions.

The pandemic relief portion of the bill was estimated at about $900billion by the Associated Press.  On January 14, the Congressional Budget Office released its scoring with Division M as $184billion and Division N as $682billion, for a total of $866billion with their breakdowns.  The Associated Press' estimates were:
 $325billion for small businesses
 $284billion in forgivable loans via the Paycheck Protection Program
 $20billion for businesses in low-income communities
 $15billion for economically endangered live venues, movie theaters and museums
 Expanded employee retention tax credit: gross receipts threshold reduced to 20%; small employer cap raised to 500; PPP borrowers eligible; worth up to $7,000 per employee per quarter.
 $166billion for a $600 stimulus check, for most Americans with an adjusted gross income lower than $75,000
 $120billion for an extension of increased federal unemployment benefits ($300 per week until March 14, 2021)
 $82billion for schools and universities, including $54billion to public K-12 schools, $23billion for higher education; $4billion to a Governors Emergency Education Relief Fund; and slightly under $1billion for Native American schools
 $69billion for vaccines, testing, and health providers
 Vaccine and treatment procurement and distribution, as well as a strategic stockpile, received over $30billion
 Testing, contact tracing, and mitigation received $22billion
 Health care providers received $9billion
 Mental health received $4.5billion
 $25billion for a federal aid to state and local governments for rental assistance programs (also covering rent arrears, utilities, and home energy costs)
 $13billion to increase the monthly Supplemental Nutrition Assistance Program (SNAP/food stamp) benefit by 15% through June 30, 2021
 $13billion round of direct payments to the farming and ranching industry, including
 About $5billion for payments of $20 per acre for row crop producers, which (according to an American Farm Bureau Federation analysis) would go to producers of corn ($1.8billion), soybeans ($1.7billion), wheat ($890million), and cotton ($240million).
 Up to $1billion for livestock and poultry farmers, plus certain "plus-up" payments for cattle producers
 $470million for dairy producers, plus additional $400million for the USDA to purchase milk for processing into dairy products for donation to food banks
 $60million for small meat and poultry processors
 $10billion for child care (specifically, the Child Care Development Block Grant program)
 $10billion for the U.S. Postal Service (in the form of forgiveness of a previous federal loan)

The legislation also extends the Centers for Disease Control and Prevention-imposed eviction moratorium (halting evictions for failure to pay rent for tenants with annual incomes of less than $99,000) to January 31, 2021; the moratorium had initially been set to expire at the end of 2020.

Regular appropriations
The regular annual appropriations bills comprise Divisions A through L of the bill, and totals about $1.4trillion.  Among these provisions are:
 $1.375billion for the Mexico-United States border wall
 Hyde Amendment, which prohibits federal funds from being used for abortions

Division A – Agriculture, rural development, FDA 
 $114billion for the Supplemental Nutrition Assistance Program (SNAP) and $25.118billion for Child Nutrition Programs, including $42 million for the Summer Electronic Benefits Transfer program (including an expansion to new states), and $30 million for school meal equipment grants, and $6billion in discretionary Women, Infants and Children funding
 $23.4billion for agriculture, rural development, the FDA, and related agencies (an increase of $217million from FY2020
 $7billion to expand broadband access for students, families and unemployed workers, including $300million for rural broadband and $250million for telehealth

Division B – Commerce, justice, science 
 Justice spending, including:
 $33.8billion overall for the U.S. Department of Justice (an increase of $1.18billion from FY2020)
 $3.385billion in law enforcement grants (an increase of $107million from FY2020), including $513.5million for Violence Against Women Act programs, $484million for Byrne JAG, $386million for the Community Oriented Policing Services Program, $244million for the State Criminal Alien Assistance Program, $189million for sexual assault kit and DNA evidence backlogs, $100million for Second Chance Act prisoner reentry programs, $526.5million for opioid crisis grant programs, $132million for the STOP School Violence Act, and $85million for National Instant Criminal Background Check improvement grants.
 $409.4million for First Step Act programs
 $5million for the creation of a database to track police misconduct
 $23.3billion for NASA

Division C – Defense 
 $695.9billion for the Department of Defense (a decrease of $9.7billion from FY 2020)
 $68.7billion for the Overseas Contingency Operations fund
 A 3% rise in military pay
 $2.3billion for a second Virginia-class attack submarine, a key priority for certain legislators who have pressed for the construction of two attack subs per year
 $2billion for the Space Force

Division D – Energy and water development 
 $39.62billion for the U.S. Department of Energy (an increase of $1billion from FY2020)

Division E – Financial services, general government 
 $13.49billion for the U.S. Department of the Treasury (an increase of $429.9million from FY2020), including
 $11.92billion to the Internal Revenue Service
 $270million for the Community Development Financial Institutions Fund
 $175million for the Office of Terrorism and Financial Intelligence
 $170million for the Treasury Inspector General for Tax Administration
 $127million for Financial Crimes Enforcement Network
 $41million for the Treasury Inspector General
 $25million for the digitization of savings bonds records
 $20million for Committee on Foreign Investment in the United States programs and enforcement

Division F – Homeland security 
 $51.88billion for the U.S. Department of Homeland Security (an increase of $1.41billion from FY2020, if offsetting collections and major disaster funding are excluded)
 $21.67billion for the Federal Emergency Management Agency (a decrease of $604.1million from FY2020, but $12.32billion more than Trump's budget request)

Division G – Interior, environment 
 $13.7billion in discretionary funding for the U.S. Department of the Interior (an increase of $186million from FY2020), $3.12billion for the National Park Service, $1.67billion for the Bureau of Reclamation (water resources and Western drought programs), $1.27billion for the Bureau of Land Management; $222.6million for the Office of Surface Mining Reclamation and Enforcement, $515million for the Payment in Lieu of Taxes program; funding for the Land and Water Conservation Fund
 $9.2billion to the Environmental Protection Agency (an increase of $180million from FY2020)

Division H – Labor, health, education 
 Labor funding, including:
 $9.4billion for the U.S. Department of Labor Employment and Training Administration, including $2.85billion for Workforce Innovation and Opportunity Act training formula grants
 $592million for the Occupational Safety and Health Administration, $246million for the Wage and Hour Division, $185million for the Registered Apprenticeship Program, $96million for the International Labor Affairs Bureau, $45million for the Strengthening Community College Training Grants program
 $97billion for "base discretionary funding" Health and Human Services, plus $24.7billion in discretionary funding for the Administration for Children and Families, $42.9billion for the National Institutes of Health, $7.9billion for the Centers for Disease Control and Prevention, $5.9billion for the Child Care and Development Block Grant, $2.8billion for the Public Health and Social Services Emergency Fund, $6billion for the Substance Abuse and Mental Health Services Administration, $7.5billion for the Health Resources and Services Administration, $2.4billion for the Ryan White HIV/AIDS program, $745million for the Community Services Block Grant, $551million to the Office of the HHS Secretary, and $62million for the Office of Minority Health.
 Education spending, including:
 $73.5billion for the U.S. Department of Education (an increase of $785million from FY2020).
 Funding for formula grants under the Elementary and Secondary Education Act, including $16.5billion for Title I grants to low-income schools, $14.1billion for Individuals with Disabilities Education, $2.1billion for Title II teacher professional development state grants, $1.2billion for Title IV Student Support and Academic Enrichment Grants, $10.7billion for Head Start and $5.9billion for Child Care and Development Block Grant, $1.3billion for Career and Technical Education State Grants, and $1.1billion for Federal TRIO Programs. All the formula grant programs' appropriations represented an increase from FY2020.

Division I – Legislative branch 
 $5.3billion for the legislative branch, including $757.3million for the Library of Congress, $675.1million for the Architect of the Capitol, $661.1million for the Government Accountability Office, $515.5million for the Capitol Police, $117million for the Government Publishing Office, $57.3million for the Congressional Budget Office, $5million for the Office of the Attending Physician, and $2million for the House Modernization Initiatives Account. The bill does not include any pay increase for members of Congress.

Division J – Military construction and veterans affairs 
 $243billion in mandatory and discretionary funding for the U.S. Department of Veterans Affairs (including advance appropriations from the preceding year). VA funding increased by almost 12% from the previous fiscal year. VA appropriations include $10.3 billion for veterans' mental health (including $312 million specifically for suicide prevention), $3.2billion to address the Veterans Benefits Administration backlog of disability claims, $16billion for MISSION Act community care, $2.6billion for VA electronic health record modernization, $1.9 billion for programs addressing veteran homelessness, and $1.2billion for the Caregivers Program. The act also provides $130 billion in advance appropriations for fiscal year 2022 to ensure continuity of VA funding and prevent a future partial government shutdown from affecting the VA.
 Appropriations for military construction declined 28% from the prior fiscal year.

Division K – State and foreign operations 
The act appropriated $55.5 billion for the Department of State, foreign operations, related programs, and the Overseas Contingency Operations (OCO) funds. This was an increase from the amount appropriated in the previous fiscal year, but lower than the bills approved by the House and Senate. The act also included funding for the U.S. contribution to the replenishment of the Global Fund to Fight Aids, Tuberculosis and Malaria, a goal of global health advocates. The foreign aid appropriations are an increase of about 1%.
 $16.68 billion for State Department operations
 $8 billion in Overseas Contingency Operations (OCO) funds
 $7.8 billion for humanitarian and disaster assistance
 $3.4 billion for the development assistance account
 $2.42 billion for democracy programs
 $33million for democracy promotion programs for Venezuela
 $2.1 billion for multilateral assistance
 $1.66 billion for USAID operating expenses and USAID Office of Inspector General
 $1.3 billion for the Foreign Military Financing program, including $1.3 billion for Egypt (with disbursement of those funds dependent on certain conditions)
 $1 billion for food security and agricultural development
 $906 million for the Millennium Challenge Corporation
 $875 million for education (including $100 million for Global Partnership for Education and $25 million for Education Cannot Wait)
 $500million for missile defense systems for Israel
 $299 million for the U.S. International Development Finance Corporation

Division L – Transportation, housing and urban development 
 $86.7billion for the U.S. Department of Transportation (an increase of $553 million from FY 2020).
 $49.1billion for the Federal Highway Administration, 94% of which is allocated to states and local governments as part of the federal-aid highway program
 $13billion for the Federal Transit Administration
 $2.8billion for the Federal Railroad Administration, including the Consolidated Rail Infrastructure and Safety Improvements and Federal-State Partnership for State of Good Repair programs
 $2billion for Amtrak, of which $1.3billion is for National Network Grants and $700million is for Northeast Corridor Grants
 $7.8billion for the U.S. Army Corps of Engineers
 $60.3billion in budget authority for the U.S. Department of Housing and Urban Development ($49.6billion from discretionary appropriations, $10.7billion from offsetting receipts), representing "an increase of $3.8billion in programmatic funding" from FY2020 and $12.3billion more than Trump's budget request. Congress rejected Trump's proposal to eliminate all funding for the Public Housing Capital Fund, HOME, Community Development Block Grant, and Choice Neighborhoods programs.

Other provisions 
Divisions O through Z and AA through FF contains additional legislation (called "authorizing matters") unrelated to coronavirus relief and annual appropriations. Additionally, the appropriations provisions of the bill contain various policy riders. The addition of such provisions to omnibus spending legislation ("loading up the Christmas tree") is common toward the end of a congressional session. Among these are:
 a directive to establish the Smithsonian American Women's History Museum and the National Museum of the American Latino within the Smithsonian Institution, with locations on or near the National Mall in Washington
 the re-authorization of intelligence programs
 copyright and trademark protections, including creation of a small-claims court in the United States Copyright Office via the CASE Act, and creating felony penalties for mass-streaming of copyrighted material via the Protecting Lawful Streaming Act
 Incorporation of the Aircraft Certification, Safety and Accountability Act, addressing aircraft safety issues in the wake of Boeing 737 MAX incidents
 Incorporation of the Leonel Rondon Pipeline Safety Act, named after a man killed in the 2018 Merrimack Valley gas explosions; the bill strengthens pipeline safety requirements
 Incorporation of the Preventing Online Sales of E-Cigarettes to Children Act, requiring in-person age verification when online purchases of e-cigarette and vaping products are delivered
 Incorporation of the Horseracing Integrity and Safety Act, establishing national safety standards for the horse racing industry, in a bid to combat horse doping—a subject of scandal in preceding years

Healthcare 
 A ban on most surprise medical billing—unexpected, and sometimes large, bills from out-of-network providers that are charged to patients. The ban, which goes into effect in 2022, will require out-of-network providers to negotiate with insurers to obtain compensation, rather than billing insured patients directly. The ban on surprising billing will apply to physicians, hospitals, and air ambulances, but does not apply to ground ambulances. The ban on surprise billing had broad public support; a similar provision nearly passed in 2019, but was blocked amid health providers and the private-equity firms that own many of them.
 Reauthorizing funding for community health centers for three years
 Extension of Medicare and Medicaid reimbursement rates for health care providers and procedures

Tax provisions 
 Various "tax extenders" extending expiring tax breaks; including making permanent a previous reduction in the excise tax for producers of beer, wine, and distilled spirits (a measure advocated for by the alcohol industry); extension of the wind production tax credit (advocated by the American Wind Energy Association); a tax extender for the motorsports entertainment industry (benefiting NASCAR and others); and a tax extender for buyers of "two-wheeled plug-in electric vehicles" (electric motorcycles and scooters)
 A tax deduction for corporate meal expenses; inclusion of this provision was pushed by Trump and administration officials, but was criticized by many House Democrats who referred to it as a needless "three-martini lunch" tax break, as well as by economists across the political spectrum. During negotiations, Democrats ultimately agreed to include the deduction in exchange for Republicans' agreement to the expansion of tax credits for the working poor and low-income families.

Education 
 increasing the maximum Pell Grant amount by $150 (bringing it to $6,495)
 allowing incarcerated students to receive Pell Grants
 forgiving $1.3billion in debt from federal loans made to 44 historically black colleges and universities
 simplifying the FAFSA form (reducing its size from 108 questions to 36 questions)
 appropriating $28million to the Institute of Education Sciences

Foreign and human rights policy 
 Incorporation of the Taiwan Assurance Act, directing the Department of State to review its guidance governing U.S.-Taiwan relations
 Incorporation of the Tibet Policy and Support Act, directing the establishment of a U.S. consulate in Tibet and reaffirming U.S. policy on the succession or reincarnation of the Dalai Lama, stating that "Interference by the Government of the People's Republic of China or any other government in the process of recognizing a successor or reincarnation of the 14th Dalai Lama and any future Dalai Lamas would represent a clear abuse of the right to religious freedom of Tibetan Buddhists and the Tibetan people."
 Incorporation of the Belarus Democracy, Human Rights, and Sovereignty Act, reauthorizing and expanding the Belarus Democracy Act of 2004, stating that it is U.S. policy to reject the allegedly fraudulent 2020 Belarusian presidential election; refusing to recognize Lukashenka as the legitimately elected leader of Belarus; and strengthening the current human rights sanctions regime on Belarus
 Establishment, within the Department of State, of an Office of Sanctions Coordination to coordinatе sanctions policy both within the Department of State and externally with allies

Energy and environmental provisions 
 A comprehensive update to clean energy research and development programs at the Department of Energy known as the Energy Act of 2020, authorizing over $35 billion in funding. The legislation is based on the American Energy Innovation Act proposed by Senate Energy and Natural Resources Committee Chair Lisa Murkowski
 $10 billion for water projects, such as coastal protection, flood control, and environmental projects of the U.S. Army Corps of Engineers. The legislation, which incorporated language from the  Water Resources Development Act of 2020 (passed by the House earlier in the session) authorizes a record number of water projects
 A phase-out of hydrochlorofluorocarbons (HFCs), a powerful greenhouse gas that contributes to climate change; the measure will decrease HFC usage by 85% over 15 years, to avert what would otherwise be an additional 0.5 °C of global warming. This aligns with the goals of the Kigali Amendment of the Montreal Protocol, which the United States had not ratified at the time of passage.
 Extending various energy efficiency tax incentives through 2021
 Making the 179D commercial building tax deduction for improvements to building energy efficiency
 Extending, through the end of 2021, the underground and surface-mine coal excise tax, which funds the Black Lung Disability Trust Fund
 Extending, through the end of 2025, the 9-cent-per-barrel excise tax on crude oil, which funds the Oil Spill Liability Trust Fund
 Reauthorize the Pipeline and Hazardous Materials Safety Administration (PHMSA), of the U.S. Department of Transportation, for five years. The PHMSA reauthorization was the result of a compromise, and did not include ambitious climate change mitigation and methane-control provisions initially proposed by House Democrats.
 Blocked the greater sage grouse from being listed under the Endangered Species Act
 Limiting oil and gas extraction in the area of Chaco Culture National Historical Park, New Mexico
 Small additions to the area of Saguaro National Park
 Redesignation of New River Gorge National River to New River Gorge National Park and Preserve

Economic analyses
Economists projected that the relief act (in conjunction with the development and distribution of COVID-19 vaccines) would have a stimulative effect and would strengthen U.S. economic recovery in the second half of 2021, but came too late to avert a struggling economy in the first half of 2021. An analysis by economists Adam Hersh and Mark Paul, commissioned by the Groundwork Collaborative, a progressive think tank, concluded that Congress would need to enact a near-term stimulus about four times larger in order to obtain a full recovery.

The bill's omission of grants to state and local governments, which are struggling with budget shortfalls, was criticized by economists, who noted that the lack of revenue would lead to state and local governments eliminating jobs and raising taxes.

Economists stated that the $25billion in rental assistance programs allocated by the bill were insufficient to prevent a looming eviction crisis.

See also
 Economic impact of the COVID-19 pandemic in the United States
 List of COVID-19 pandemic legislation
 U.S. federal government response to the COVID-19 pandemic

References

Footnotes

Citations

External links
 Consolidated Appropriations Act, 2021 as amended (PDF/details) in the GPO Statute Compilations collection
 Consolidated Appropriations Act, 2021 as enacted (PDF/details) in the US Statutes at Large
 H.R.133 Consolidated Appropriations Act, 2021 on Congress.gov

Acts of the 116th United States Congress
Law associated with the COVID-19 pandemic in the United States
United States federal appropriations legislation
Omnibus legislation
Economic responses to the COVID-19 pandemic
Government responses to UFOs